<mapframe
text="Port Gamble Forest Heritage Park"
width=242
height=180
zoom=11
latitude=47.816667
longitude=-122.6/>
Port Gamble Forest Heritage Park is a  county park founded in 2014, and is the largest in Kitsap County, Washington. It contains  of trails.

The park property was acquired from
Pope Resources/Olympic Resource Management, a forestry company, partly in direct purchases by the county government, and partly by the Forterra land conservation non-profit corporation who raised funds through individual donations and grants.

Olympic Resource Management's Olympic Property Group proposed a public trail system in its Port Gamble property  2007. Invoking the Olmsted Brothers park planning, local groups envisioned a regional "String of Pearls" trail plan  2011 in the Pacific Northwest linking water trails linking the Olympic National Park on the Olympic Peninsula with the Kitsap Peninsula. A proposed system, the Sound to Olympics Trail, would allow one to cross Washington State by foot on a continuous trail system from the Pacific Ocean to the Idaho border. Kitsap County plans to embody a portion of the Sound to Olympics Trail in the Port Gamble Forest.

References

Further reading

External links

2014 establishments in Washington (state)
Parks in Kitsap County, Washington